The 1990 Northern Arizona Lumberjacks football team was an American football team that represented Northern Arizona University (NAU) as a member of the Big Sky Conference (Big Sky) during the 1990 NCAA Division I-AA football season. In their first year under head coach Steve Axman, the Lumberjacks compiled a 5–6 record (3–5 against conference opponents), were outscored by a total of 416 to 290, and placed in a four-way tie for fifth out of nine teams in the Big Sky. The team played its home games at the J. Lawrence Walkup Skydome, commonly known as the Walkup Skydome, in Flagstaff, Arizona.

Schedule

References

Northern Arizona
Northern Arizona Lumberjacks football seasons
Northern Arizona Lumberjacks football